The stripe-breasted tit (Melaniparus fasciiventer) is a species of bird in the family Paridae.
It is found in Burundi, Democratic Republic of the Congo, Rwanda, and Uganda.
Its natural habitats are subtropical or tropical moist montane forests.

The stripe-breasted tit was formerly one of the many species in the genus Parus but was moved to Melaniparus after a molecular phylogenetic analysis published in 2013 showed that the members of the new genus formed a distinct clade.

References

stripe-breasted tit
Birds of Sub-Saharan Africa
stripe-breasted tit
Taxonomy articles created by Polbot